Monotoideae  is a subfamily of the plant family Dipterocarpaceae, with 3 genera and 30 species. It is native to the rainforest habitat of Africa and Madagascar, as well as South America. The geographical discontinuity can be traced back to a date prior to the separation of these land masses and the subsequent migration, evolution and preservation of the species in suitable habitats.

Genera
 Marquesia is native to Africa.
 Monotes has 26 species, distributed across Africa and Madagascar.
 Pseudomonotes is native to the Colombian Amazon and Pacaraima Mountains.

References

External links
 

Dipterocarpaceae
Rosid subfamilies